David Allen Thomas Jr. (born July 15, 1955) is an American voice actor and painter. He is also known as Dave Thomas.

He is known for the voice of The Sorrow in Metal Gear Solid 3: Snake Eater/Metal Gear Solid 3: Subsistence and Echo in Red Faction 2. He started his career in 1981 as a soldier in a TV version of Othello.

Filmography

Animation
 As Told By Ginger — Farmer Don
 Cowboy Bebop — Gren (credited as Robert Matthews)
 Royal Space Force: The Wings of Honnêamise — Shiro (credited as Robert Matthews)
 Teknoman Blade — Blade/Nick Carter/Teknoman Blade
 Fast & Furious Spy Racers – Cleve Kelso (2019- ) (Recurring, season 3; Guest, season 1)

Video game
 Chaos Legion — The Old Man/Intelligencer
 Diablo II — Barbarian
 Enter the Matrix — Additional voices
 Fight Club — Irvin
 Freedom Fighters — Additional voices
 Freedom: First Resistance — Vickers/Pieter PK/Rodney
 Gabriel Knight 3: Blood of the Sacred, Blood of the Damned — Detective Mosely
 Lionheart — Additional voices
 Metal Gear Solid 3: Snake Eater — The Sorrow/Premier Nikita Khrushchev
 Metal Gear Solid 3: Subsistence — The Sorrow/Chairman Nikita Khrushchev
 Might and Magic: World of Xeen — Additional voices
 Red Faction II — Echo
 The Incredible Hulk: Ultimate Destruction — General Thunderbolt Ross

References

External links
 
 

Living people
American male voice actors
American male video game actors
Place of birth missing (living people)
1955 births